CPR2 can refer to:

 Ottawa/Embrun Aerodrome, (TC LID: CPR2)
 CPR2, a candidate phylum of bacteria